Joseph Barrett Wentz (born October 6, 1997) is an American professional baseball pitcher for the Detroit Tigers of Major League Baseball (MLB). The Atlanta Braves selected Wentz with the 40th overall pick in the 2016 MLB draft and traded him to the Tigers in 2019. He made his MLB debut in 2022.

Early life
Wentz was born on October 6, 1997, to Dave and Jenny Wentz. He first met Riley Pint in second grade, and the two became friends.

Wentz attended Shawnee Mission East High School in Prairie Village, Kansas. He was named the Sunflower League Player of the Year in 2015 and 2016, his junior and senior years. Wentz won the 2015 Junior Home Run Derby at the 2015 Major League Baseball All-Star Game, hitting one home run that traveled .

Professional career

Atlanta Braves
Wentz committed to the University of Virginia. He had been scouted by Major League Baseball (MLB) teams prior to the 2016 MLB draft. Considered a likely first round pick, the Atlanta Braves selected him in the first Competitive Balance round, with the 40th overall selection. Wentz chose to sign with the Braves for $3.05 million rather than attend college. Wentz started his career with the Gulf Coast Braves of the Rookie-level Gulf Coast League and was later promoted to the Danville Braves of the Rookie-level Appalachian League. He finished the 2016 season with a 1–4 win–loss record, 3.68 earned run average, and 53 strikeouts in 44 innings pitched. Wentz spent 2017 with the Rome Braves, posting an 8–3 record with a 2.60 ERA in 26 starts, and 2018 with the Florida Fire Frogs where he was 3–4 with a 2.28 ERA in 16 starts.

Detroit Tigers
On July 31, 2019, the Braves traded Wentz and Travis Demeritte to the Detroit Tigers in exchange for Shane Greene. In his first full season at the AA level, Wentz went 7–8 with a 4.20 ERA and 137 strikeouts in  innings. The Tigers added him to their 40-man roster after the 2020 season. He had Tommy John surgery in March 2020 and missed the season. He was optioned to Triple-A to begin the 2021 season. Working his way back from surgery, Wentz pitched a total of 18 games at the A and AA levels, posting an 0–7 record with a 5.25 ERA and 82 strikeouts in 72 innings.

On May 11, 2022, Wentz was recalled and promoted to the major leagues for the first time to start against the Oakland Athletics.

In his third start for the Tigers on September 9, 2022, Wentz earned his first major league win against the Kansas City Royals, allowing no runs in  innings while striking out five.

References

Further reading

External links

1997 births
Living people
People from Lawrence, Kansas
Baseball players from Kansas
Major League Baseball pitchers
Detroit Tigers players
Gulf Coast Braves players
Danville Braves players
Rome Braves players
Florida Fire Frogs players
Mississippi Braves players
Lakeland Flying Tigers players
Erie SeaWolves players
Toledo Mud Hens players